Member of parliament in India refers to persons who serve in the Indian parliament. These include:

 Member of Parliament, Lok Sabha: Representative of the Indian voters to the Lok Sabha, the lower house of the Parliament of India.
 Member of Parliament, Rajya Sabha: Representative of the Indian states to the upper house of the Parliament of India (Rajya Sabha).

In addition to the 29 MPs representing the state in the upper and lower houses, there are 4 MPs from Kerala who have either been nominated or elected from other states . Totally there are 33 MPs working for Kerala and representing Kerala in both houses in Parliament.

List of Lok Sabha MPs from Kerala
The Lok Sabha is the lower house of the Parliament of India and there are 20 Lok Sabha MPs from Kerala

Keys:

UDF (18)

LDF (2)

List of Rajya Sabha MPs from Kerala

The Rajya Sabha is the upper house of the Parliament of India and there are 9 Rajya Sabha MPs from Kerala.

Keys:
LDF (7)

UDF (2)

List of MPs from Kerala who were nominated or elected in other states 
In addition to the 29 MPs representing the state in the upper and lower houses, there are 3 Keralites who have either been nominated or elected in other states.

See also
 Kerala Council of Ministers
 2021 Indian Rajya Sabha elections
 2019 Indian general election in Kerala
 List of Rajya Sabha members from Kerala
 List of nominated members of the Rajya Sabha

References

Notes

Citations

 
Lists of people from Kerala
MPs